Riebeckia  is a genus of air-breathing tropical land snails, terrestrial pulmonate gastropod mollusks in the subfamily Coeliaxinae of the family Achatinidae.

Species
 Riebeckia adonensis (Godwin-Austen, 1881)
 Riebeckia decipiens (E. A. Smith, 1897)
 Riebeckia enodis (Godwin-Austen, 1881)
 Riebeckia gollonsirensis (Godwin-Austen, 1881)
 Riebeckia sokotorana (E. von Martens, 1881)
Synonyms
 Riebeckia lavranosi Salvat, 1969: synonym of Riebeckia sokotorana (E. von Martens, 1881) (junior synonym)
 Riebeckia sordida Neubert, 2002: synonym of Balfouria sordida (Neubert, 2002) (original name)

References

 Martens, E. von (1883). III. Mollusken von Sokotra. Conchologische Mittheilungen, 2 (3/4): 140-152, pl. 28, 29.
 Salvat, B., 1969. Mollusques terrestres de Socotra et d'Abd-el-Kuri (Océan Indien). Récoltes de M. Lavranos. Mémoires du Muséum national d'Histoire naturelle 41(3): 743-754, sér. 2ème série, part. Zoologie
 Bank, R. A. (2017). Classification of the Recent terrestrial Gastropoda of the World. Last update: July 16th, 2017.

External links
 Neubert, E. & Bochud, E. (2020). The continental malacofauna of Arabia and adjacent areas, VII. The family Achatinidae (Coeliaxinae, Subulininae) in the Socotran Archipelago (Gastropoda, Pulmonata). Rendiconti Lincei. Scienze Fisiche e Naturali. 31 (4): 655–676

Achatinidae